The 1990 World Badminton Grand Prix was the eighth edition of the World Badminton Grand Prix finals. It was held in Denpasar, Bali, Indonesia, from December 12 to December 16, 1990.

Final results

Men's singles

Women's singles

External links
Archived site of tangkis.com

World Grand Prix
World Badminton Grand Prix
B
Badminton tournaments in Indonesia